The following is a list of all team-to-team transactions that have occurred in the National Hockey League during the 1919–20 NHL season. It lists what team each player has been traded to, signed by, or claimed by, and for which player(s), if applicable.

Rights retained
Note: This is the list of players who were retained with the return of the Quebec Athletics for the 1919–20 NHL season.

Free agency

Trades

References

TSN transactions
Official NHL Free Agent signings
The Hockey News transactions

Transactions
National Hockey League transactions